Franco Squillari was the defending champion.

Squillari successfully defended his title, defeating Tommy Haas 6–4, 6–4 in the final.

Seeds

  Thomas Enqvist (semifinals)
  Younes El Aynaoui (quarterfinals)
  Tommy Haas (final)
  Mariano Zabaleta (first round)
  Andrei Medvedev (first round)
  Fernando Meligeni (quarterfinals)
  Franco Squillari (champion)
  Slava Doseděl (second round)

Draw

Finals

Top half

Bottom half

External links
 2000 BMW Open Singles draw

Singles